Ashok Nagar Metro station is a Metro railway station on the Line 2 of the Chennai Metro, which is currently under operation. The station is among the elevated stations coming up along corridor II of the Chennai Metro, Chennai Central–St. Thomas Mount stretch. The station will serve the neighbourhoods of Ashok Nagar and Mambalam.

History

Construction history

The station was constructed by Consolidated Constructed Consortium (CCCL). The consolidated cost of the station along with the stations of Koyambedu, Arumbakkam, CMBT, and Vadapalani was  1,395.4 million.

The station
Upon completion, Ashok Nagar Metro Rail station will be the highest elevated station in the entire Chennai Metro Rail system. Initially planned to have a ground floor, a concourse floor and a platform floor, four additional floors have been planned to the original plan to make it a six-storey structure, chiefly to generate revenue by letting out the floors to offices and commercial establishments. After completion, the station will have a height of more than 40 metres, which will be higher than the Alandur metro rail elevated station where the two corridors of Phase I of the Chennai Metro Rail (viz. Washermenpet-Airport and Central-St Thomas Mount lines) converge.

Unlike other stations of the system which are located in the middle of busy main roads, the station is located a little away from 100-Feet Road in the middle of a residential area.

Layout

Facilities

Supportive infrastructure
Along with Koyambedu and Vadapalani Metro stations, Ashok Nagar Metro station will be developed by leasing out space either for shops or office spaces. As part of fire safety measures, underground water tanks of 50,000 to 100,000 litre capacity will be set up at the station.

The station has a skywalk that connects Udayam Theatre with the Metro station.

Connections
Metropolitan Transport Corporation (Chennai) bus routes number 5E, 5T, 11G, 11H, 12G, 18F, 18M, 49A, 77J, 111, 113, 114, 170, 170A, 170B, 170C, 170CET, 170K, 170L, 170M, 170P, 170S, 270J, 500C, 568C, 568T, 570, 570AC, 570S, A70, B70, D70, D70CUT, D70NS, D170, F70, M70, M70CNS, M70D, M70NS, M70S, M170T, M270, S20, S26, S86 serves the station from nearby Udhayam Theatre (Ashok Pillar) bus stand.

Entry/Exit

See also

References

External links
 

 UrbanRail.Net – descriptions of all metro systems in the world, each with a schematic map showing all stations.

Chennai Metro stations
Railway stations in Chennai